Bolitoglossa la is a lungless salamander in the family Plethodontidae endemic to Guatemala.

References

la
Endemic fauna of Guatemala
Amphibians of Guatemala
Amphibians described in 2010